The Beijing central business district, or Beijing CBD, is a central business district and the primary area for finance, media, and business services in Beijing, China.

Beijing CBD occupies 3.99 km2 of the Chaoyang District on the east side of the city. Geographically situated to the east of the city center, sandwiched between the 3rd Ring Road and the 4th Ring Road, the Beijing CBD is currently undergoing large-scale development.

Economic history and importance
As Beijing is becoming one of the most important international financial centers in China, Beijing CBD was recently positioned as the secondary core area in Beijing's International Financial Center Development strategic plan published in May, 2008. Beijing CBD is also emerging as China's media center as Beijing Television Station (BTV) just moved in its new headquarters (Beijing TV Centre) in this area and the new CCTV Headquarters was officially opened on the night of 15 June 2008.

In the eight years since the government decided to speed up construction of the district, the Beijing CBD has attracted 117 Fortune 500 businesses in the financial, media, information technology, consulting and service industries. More than 60 percent of overseas-funded companies in Beijing are in the CBD. A majority of foreign embassies in Beijing - the No 1, No 2 and No 3 embassy districts are now concentrated in the Beijing CBD and its neighboring areas.

The Beijing CBD Administrative Committee, established in 2001, is in charge of planning and management and aims to facilitate investments and improve the work environment for professionals. The committee provides information to investors on laws, taxes and state policies as well as a one-stop service, which has simplified approval procedures and raised efficiency.

The establishment of the Beijing CBD Chamber of Finance, the Beijing CBD Chamber of Media Industry and Beijing CBD Association of Property Management & Real Estate Development has facilitated communication and cooperation between the government and enterprises. The Beijing CBD International Business Festival and Beijing CBD International Forum have put the Beijing CBD on the map worldwide.

Skyscrapers in the Beijing CBD

 China Zun
 China World Trade Center Tower III
 Beijing Yintai Centre
 Beijing TV Centre
 Fortune Plaza
 CCTV Headquarters
 Jing Guang Centre
 China World Trade Center
 SK Tower Beijing
 China World Trade Center Tower III Phase B

Education

 Beijing Ritan High School

See also
 Beijing Financial Street
 List of economic and technological development zones in Beijing

References

Central business districts in China
Chaoyang District, Beijing
Economy of Beijing
Central business district